Stigmella catharticella is a moth of the family Nepticulidae. It is found in from Fennoscandia to the Pyrenees, Italy and Bulgaria, and from Ireland to Russia.

The head is ferruginous-orange, collar whitish. Antennal eyecaps whitish. Posterior tarsi whitish, spotted with dark fuscous. Forewings are dark fuscous, faintly purple -tinged ; a roundish white tornal spot; outer half of cilia white. Hindwings grey. Adults are on wing from May to June and again from July to September.

The larvae feed on Rhamnus catharticus. They mine the leaves of their host plant. The mine consists of a full depth corridor, beginning at an under-surface egg shell. The corridor makes several sharp turns, so much so that the loops almost touch. The last section of the corridor is significantly wider. Pupation takes place outside of the mine.

References

External links
Fauna Europaea
bladmineerders.nl
Swedish moths
Norfolk moths
 Stigmella catharticella images at  Consortium for the Barcode of Life

Nepticulidae
Moths of Europe
Moths described in 1853